Edwin Albert Baker,  (January 9, 1893 – April 7, 1968) was a Canadian co-founder of the Canadian National Institute for the Blind (CNIB).

Born in Collins Bay, Ontario, he graduated with a Bachelor of Science in electrical engineering from Queen's University in 1914 and later that year enlisted with the Sixth Field Company, Canadian Engineers. In 1915, he was wounded in France, losing his sight in both eyes.

In 1918, he and six others founded the CNIB. He served as first Vice-President from 1918 to 1920 and Managing Director & General Secretary from 1920 until his retirement in 1962.

He married Jessie Robinson. They had three sons and a daughter.

Honours
 In 1935, he was made an Officer of the Order of the British Empire.
 In 1938, he was awarded an Honorary Doctor of Laws from Queen's University, and in 1945, the same from the University of Toronto.
 Croix de Guerre
 In 1967, he was made a Companion of the Order of Canada.

Related book

References
 
 
 
 

1893 births
1968 deaths
Canadian military personnel of World War I
Companions of the Order of Canada
Recipients of the Croix de Guerre (France)
Canadian Officers of the Order of the British Empire
People from Frontenac County
Queen's University at Kingston alumni
Canadian recipients of the Military Cross
Canadian blind people